Clube Ferroviário da Huíla, formerly Clube Ferroviário de Sá da Bandeira, is an Angolan sports club based in the city of Lubango, Huíla Province.

The club has won the Angolan Football Cup in 1985 and 1989.

Achievements
Angola Cup: 1985, 1989

In 1988, Ferroviário da Huíla became the first Angolan team to ever reach the quarter-finals of a CAF competition.

League & Cup Positions

Manager history and performance

Players

See also 
 Gira Angola

References

External links
http://www.weltfussballarchiv.com/club_profile.php?ID=10557 
http://www.calciozz.it/equipa.php?id=11612
http://www.campeoesdofutebol.com.br/angola.html
http://futeboldeangola.blogspot.it/

Football clubs in Angola
Sports clubs in Angola
Railway association football teams